Chonda Ruth Pierce (née Courtney, born March 4, 1960), is a Christian comedian often billed as "The Queen of Clean."

Background
She was born, Chonda Ruth Courtney, in Covington, Kentucky, on March 4, 1960, while she was raised in South Carolina, by her father who was a preacher and mother, Virginia Whalen.

Pierce got her start in comedy during a six-year stint at a theme park in Nashville, Tennessee called Opryland USA. A Theater Arts major from Austin Peay State University, Pierce went to the park to pay her college bill.   Not knowing how to dance, she had to memorize jokes from Grinders Switch, Tennessee and impersonate Cousin Minnie Pearl.  Having had a troubled childhood, Pierce used entertainment as a needed catharsis, reporting "I was hooked! I loved the sound of an audience laughing. It was just the medicine I needed."

Pierce has gone on to appear numerous times on the stage of The Grand Ole Opry in Nashville, Tennessee, write eight books, and become a highly sought after Christian comedian, having five gold-certified comedy albums and two platinum albums to her name.  Pierce has an ongoing concert calendar and her comedy segments also frequently appear on XM Radio's Laugh USA and Sirius Satellite Radio's Blue Collar Comedy 103.

Pierce is a member of the Christian Comedy Association, but outside the comedy, she is a spokesperson for World Vision and works with various other Christian leaders and organizations.

She has appeared in several of the Gaither Homecoming recordings and she wrote about her struggle with depression in Laughing in the Dark: A Comedian's Journey Through Depression.

References

External links
 

Living people
1960 births
American women comedians
Austin Peay State University alumni
21st-century American women